Swire is an English surname, and may refer to:

 Several members of the Swire business and political family, descended from John Swire (1793–1847), British trader and founder of the Swire Group 
 Adrian Swire (1932–2018), British businessman and former chairman of the Swire Group, son of John Kidston Swire
 Barnaby Swire (born 1964), British businessman and current chairman of the Swire Group, son of John Anthony Swire
 Hugo Swire, Baron Swire (born 1959), British politician, great-great-great-grandson of John Swire and brother of Sophia Swire
 John Kidston Swire (1893-1983), chairman of Swire Group from 1946 to 1966, grandson of John Samuel Swire
 John Anthony Swire CBE (1927-2016), former president of the Swire Group, son of John Kidston Swire
 John Samuel Swire (1825—1898), founder of Taikoo Sugar Refinery in 1881, son of John Swire
 Samuel Swire (businessman) (born 1980), British businessman, son of Adrian Swire 
 Sophia Swire (born 1963), British social entrepreneur and investor, great-great-great-granddaughter of John Swire and sister of Hugo Swire
 Claire Swire, originator of the Claire Swire email which spread globally in 2000
 Jim Swire (born 1936), British doctor involved in the investigation of the Lockerbie bombing
 Peter Swire (born 1958), American academic
 Rob Swire (born 1982), Australian record producer
 Vivienne Westwood, née Swire (1941–2022), British fashion designer

See also
 Swire Group – British-owned Hong Kong-based business conglomerate and historical Hongs of Hong Kong